Antoine Dalibard (born March 10, 1983, in Laval) is a French former professional road cyclist.

His father Philippe and grandfather Joseph Groussard were also professional cyclists.

Major results
2004
 3rd Tour d'Eure-et-Loir
2006
 5th Overall Boucles de la Mayenne
 10th Overall Étoile de Bessèges
2008
 1st  Overall Tour de Normandie
 4th Paris–Bourges
 6th Overall Boucles de la Mayenne
2009
 1st  Overall Kreiz Breizh Elites
 9th Boucles de l'Aulne

References

External links

1983 births
Living people
French male cyclists